Tsunejirō is a masculine Japanese given name.

Possible writings
Tsunejirō can be written using different combinations of kanji characters. Here are some examples:

The characters used for "jiro" (二郎 or 次郎) literally means "second son" and usually used as a suffix to a masculine name, especially for the second child. The "tsune" part of the name can use a variety of characters, each of which will change the meaning of the name ("常" for usual, "恒" for always, "毎" and so on).

常二郎, "usual, second son"
常次郎, "usual, second son"
恒二郎, "always, second son"
恒次郎, "always, second son"
毎二郎, "every, second son"
庸二郎, "usual, second son"

Other combinations...

常治郎, "usual, to manage/cure, son"
常次朗, "usual, next, clear"
恒治郎, "always, to manage/cure, son"
恒次朗, "always, next, clear"
毎次朗, "every, next, clear"

The name can also be written in hiragana つねじろう or katakana ツネジロウ.

Notable people with the name
, Imperial Japanese Navy admiral.
Tsunejiro Tanji (丹治 恆次郎, born 1935), Japanese author.
, Japanese judoka.

Japanese masculine given names